Zeba Khan (born 15 May 1965, Sambalpur) Stage Name-Aparajita Priyadarshini is an Indian actress who mostly appears in Odia Film Industry. She started her career with Sita Labakusha in 1980. Apart from big screen, she played various roles in some Odia television serials.

Early life and family 
She was born on 15 May 1965 at Sambalpur in Odisha, India to Abdul Ajit Khan and Harapriya Ray. Her uncle Rajkishore Ray is an popular literary person in Odisha. She got married to Odia actor Uttam Mohanty in 1987. Her son Babushan Mohanty is also an actor and singer in Odia film Industry.

Career 
Aparajita debuted in Ollywood with Sita Labakusha along with Uttam Mohanty in 1980. She has appeared in more than 70 Odia films in various characters. Apart from that, she has appeared in various Odia daily soaps.

Filmography 

Ajab Sanju Ra Gajab Love (2019)
Local Toka Love Chokha (2018)
Sriman Surdas (2018)
Sister Sridevi (2017)
Jabardast Premika (2016)
Sweet Heart (2016)
Super Michhua (2015)
Ishq Tu Hi Tu (2015)
Akhire Akhire (2014)
Golapi Golapi (2014)
Daha Balunga (2013)
Emiti Bi Prema Hue (2012)
 Dhauli Express (2007)
Pua Mora Bhola Sankara (1996)

Awards 

 2006: ETV Priya Odia
 1982: Best Actress Odisha State Film Awards, (Phula Chandan)

References

External links 

 

Living people
1965 births
Actresses in Odia cinema
People from Odisha